John William Horton (5 January 1901 – 1970) was an English professional footballer who made one Football League appearance for Southampton in 1921.

Football career
Horton was born in Thurnscoe, near Barnsley in Yorkshire and first came to attention when he played for Wombwell. In 1920–21 he scored a total of 40 goals, helping Wombwell to reach second place in the Yorkshire League and gain admittance to the Midland League.

In May 1921, he was signed by Southampton, then playing in the Football League Third Division South. He scored regularly for the reserve team  and made his first-team debut when he replaced Bill Rawlings for the match against Watford on 29 October 1921, which ended in a 2–0 victory for the Saints. Shortly after his debut, he broke a leg in a reserve team match at Bristol City, which ended his professional football career.

References

1901 births
English footballers
1970 deaths
Footballers from Barnsley
Southampton F.C. players
English Football League players
Association football forwards
Wombwell F.C. players